Mark Wynn  is a British philosopher of religion, philosophical theologian and academic. He is the seventh Nolloth Professor of the Philosophy of the Christian Religion Oriel College, University of Oxford. He was formerly the president of the British Society for the Philosophy of Religion.

Education and career 

Wynn earned a BA in Philosophy and Theology at the University of Oxford, Hertford College. He earned a DPhil in 1991 at Oxford (Linacre College) under the supervision of Brian Davies and Richard Swinburne for his dissertation, God and the World: The Place of Explanation in Natural Theology.

Following a position at King’s College London, he became a research fellow at University of Glasgow. He then held positions at the Australian Catholic University and the University of Exeter. From 2013 to 2020, Wynn was a professor of philosophy and religion at the University of Leeds. He joined the Faculty of Theology and Religion and the Faculty of Philosophy at Oxford in July 2020.

In 2022, he was elected a Fellow of the British Academy (FBA), the United Kingdom's national academy for the humanities and social sciences.

Books 

 God and Goodness: A Natural Theological Perspective (Routledge, 2002)
 Emotional Experience and Religious Understanding: Integrating Perception, Conception and Feeling (Cambridge University Press, 2005)
 Faith and Place: An Essay in Embodied Religious Epistemology (Oxford University Press, 2009)
 Renewing the Senses: A Study of the Philosophy and Theology of the Spiritual Life (Oxford University Press, 2013)
 Spiritual Traditions and the Virtues: Living Between Heaven and Earth (Oxford University Press, 2020)

References

External links 
 Professor Mark Wynn at the University of Oxford Faculty of Theology and Religion
 Professor Mark Wynn at Oriel College

Living people
20th-century English philosophers
20th-century English theologians
21st-century English philosophers
21st-century English theologians
Alumni of Hertford College, Oxford
Christian apologists
Christian philosophers
Nolloth Professors of the Philosophy of the Christian Religion
Philosophers of religion
Year of birth missing (living people)
Fellows of the British Academy